Akshay Sharma was an Indian writer.

Early life 

Akshay Chandra Sharma was born in a small village of Rajasthan during the rule of British in India. He was educated at Shree Jain School and Ummed School in Ladnu. During his youth, he was greatly influenced by ideological principles of Mahatma Gandhi, the main leader of freedom movements in India at that time. He worked as the principle of Bharatiya Vidya Mandir at Bikaner and established the Bharatiya Vidyamandir Shodh Pratisthan there. He also established Hindi Vidyalaya at Ladnu.

He travelled to many foreign destinations like Switzerland, France, Britain, London on invitation of Bharatiya Vidya Bhavan to give lectures on आज के परिपेक्ष में रामायण  ("Credibility of Ramayan in modern times").

Works

Essays 

 Nagri Pracharini Patrika
 Kalyan
 Hindustani
 Vina
 Vidhal Bharat
 Maru Bharati
 Vishwambhara 
 Dainik aur Saptahik Hindustan
 Dharmayug
 Riyasati
 Chintan Manan
 Prajasevak
 Jansatta etc.

Editorials 

 Lokmat (Daily)
 Rajasthan Bharati
 Vaichariki  (Magazine)
 Matridevo Bhavah
 Ek Khilta Suman
 Rajasthan : Vangiya dristi mein (Book)
 Nibandha Vihar

Published 

 Ramsnehi Sampraday 
 Taponista Bharat
 Gita Pustika : Ek Parishilan
 Tin Bal Natak
 Rajasthan Ki Asmita
 Kavita Sankalan
 Bharat-Vibhutiya
 Prithvi Dharyanti

Awards 
He was honoured by Vivek Sansthan with Pragya Pujan award besides many other awards at literature festivals.

Notes

Hindi-language poets
Hindi-language writers
1918 births
2009 deaths
People from Churu district
Writers from Rajasthan
20th-century Indian essayists
Indian male writers